The men's doubles competition of the racquetball events at the 2011 Pan American Games will be held from October 17–22 at the Racquetball Complex in Guadalajara, Mexico. The defending Pan American Games champion is Alvaro Beltrán and Javier Moreno of Mexico, while the defending Pan American regional champion from 2011 is Javier Moreno and Polo Gutierrez also of Mexico.

Schedule
All times are Central Standard Time (UTC-6).

Round robin
The round robin will be used as a qualification round. Groups will be announced at the technical meeting the day before the competition begins.

Pool A

Pool B

Pool C

Playoffs

References

Racquetball at the 2011 Pan American Games
Racquetball at multi-sport events